"El Perdedor" is Aventura's third  single from album K.O.B. Live (2006). The song reached big recognition in many Spanish-speaking countries. A remix was made for the song featuring Ken-Y.

Music video
The music video for "El Perdedor" is about a man who is too focused on his work and career and thus ignores pretty much ignores his lover. She is trying to make some time for them but he always puts work on top of her. Eventually, after many times of being disappointed, another man gains her attention as he is interested in her and shows it by devoting time to her.

Charts

Weekly charts

Year-end charts

Awards
The song was awarded Tropical Airplay Song Of The Year by a Duo Or Group and Latin Rhythm Airplay Song Of The Year by a Duo Or Group in the 2009 Latin Billboard Music Awards. It was also awarded the Lo Nuestro Award for Tropical Song of the Year in 2009.

References

2008 singles
Aventura (band) songs
R.K.M & Ken-Y songs
Songs written by Romeo Santos
Spanish-language songs
2006 songs